The Teekloof Formation is a geological formation that forms part of the Beaufort Group, one of the five geological groups that comprises the Karoo Supergroup in South Africa. The Teekloof Formation is the uppermost formation of Adelaide Subgroup deposits West of 24ºE and contains Middle to Late Permian-aged (Guadalupian to Lopingian) deposits and four biozones (Pristerognathus, Tropidostoma, Cistecephalus, and Daptocephalus assemblage zones) of the Beaufort Group. It overlies the Abrahamskraal Formation (the western correlate of the Middleton Formation). The Teekloof Formation does not underlie other units other than the younger Karoo dolerites and sills that relate to the emplacement of the Early Jurassic Drakensberg Group to the east. Outcrops and exposures of the Teekloof Formation range from Sutherland through the mountain escarpments between Fraserburg and Beaufort West. The northernmost localities of the Teekloof Formation are found by Loxton, Victoria West and Richmond.

Geology 
The Teekloof Formation overlies the Abrahamskraal Formation and is not capped by any other preserved sedimentation. Only East of 24ºE does the preservation of Beaufort Group rocks continue. There is no rock preservation in the western-southwestern portions of the Karoo Basin. It is unclear whether rock preservation there ceased in the Late Permian due to localized basinal tectonics, or if that rock material was preserved but later weathered away. The Teekloof Formation has five subdivisions or members which are listed below (from oldest to youngest):

 Poortjie Member - Correlates with the Pristerognathus Assemblage Zone
 Hoedemaker Member - Correlates with the Tropidostoma Assemblage Zone
 Oukloof Member - Correlates with the Cistecephalus Assemblage Zone
 Steenkampsvlakte Member - Correlates with the Daptocephalus Assemblage Zone
 Javanerskop Member - Correlates with the Daptocephalus Assemblage Zone

Lithologies 
The sedimentary rocks of this formation are predominantly reddish or minor green mudstones that are either structureless, horizontally laminated, or medium to thickly bedded. Pedogenic and diagenetic carbonate nodules and also fossil gypsum rosettes occur in the mudstone deposits. Interbedded with the mudstone deposits are minor channel sandstones ranging from pale olive to greenish-grey in colour. The sandstones  are fine to medium grained and preserve fining-upward sequences (e.g. from bottom to top: Massive, horizontally laminated, trough cross-bedded, and ripple cross-laminated sedimentary structures). In the uppermost sections of the Teekloof Formation, the Javanerskop Member contains ribbon-shaped, single storied sandstones. These sandstones in the uppermost sections contain numerous erosional surfaces lined with siltstone or mudstone pellet conglomerates.

Geologists consider the Teekloof Formation depositional environment to have been a floodplain facies association that underwent seasonal arid conditions and playa lake formation as indicated by the presence of fossil gypsum rosettes and carbonate nodules. The sandstone occurrences preserve evidence of deposition on point bars in a meandering river system. Seasonal waning flood level events are indicated by the fining upward sequences.

Paleontology 
The Teekloof Formation is rich in fossil material and is particularly renowned for its diverse therapsid fossil fauna.  Plant and invertebrate trace fossils are also found as are some preserved vertebrate fossil trackways. Well-known trackways of the pareiasaur Bradysaurus, and therapsids Diictodon and Tapinocaninus have been found by the town Fraserburg.

References 

Geologic formations of South Africa
Permian System of Africa
Permian South Africa
Mudstone formations
Siltstone formations
Sandstone formations
Fluvial deposits
Evaporite deposits
Permian southern paleotemperate deposits
Beaufort Group
Fossiliferous stratigraphic units of Africa
Paleontology in South Africa
Formations
Formations
Formations